One third of Castle Point Borough Council in Essex, England is elected each year, followed by one year without election. Until 2003 the whole council was elected every four years. Since the last boundary changes in 2003, 41 councillors have been elected from 14 wards.

Political control
Since the first election to the council in 1973 political control of the council has been held by the following parties:

Leadership
The leaders of the council since 2014 have been:

Council elections
Summary of the council composition after recent council elections, click on the year for full details of each election. Boundary changes took place for the 2003 election increasing the number of seats by 2.

Borough result maps

By-election results
By-elections occur when seats become vacant between council elections. Below is a summary of recent by-elections; full by-election results can be found by clicking on the by-election name.

References

External links
Castle Point Borough Council

 
District council elections in England
Council elections in Essex